

Introduction
Seth Hirachand Mutha College is a college located in Kalyan west, Maharashtra, India. It is an arts, commerce and science college affiliated to the University of Mumbai. It is a junior as well as a senior college.

Establishment
Mutha Shaikshanik Trust was established in the year 2000. After the establishment of the aforementioned Trust, Seth Hirachand Mutha College of Arts, Commerce and Science opened (On permanently non-aided basis).

Courses
Seth Hirachand Mutha College provides the following courses :

Junior college
XIth & XIIth Arts, Commerce & Science
Bifocal Courses
XIth & XIIth Science Information Technology
XIth & XIIth Commerce Information Technology

Degree college
Bachelor of Arts
Bachelor of Science :
Bachelor of Science-Computer Science
Bachelor of Science-Information Technology
Bachelor of Commerce :
Bachelor of Mass Media
Bachelor of Accounting & Finance
Bachelor of Banking & Insurance
Bachelor of Management Studies

References

Universities and colleges in Maharashtra
Affiliates of the University of Mumbai
Education in Kalyan-Dombivli
Educational institutions established in 2000
2000 establishments in Maharashtra